Gonfaron is a commune in the Var department in the Provence-Alpes-Côte d'Azur region, Southeastern France. In 2019, it had a population of 4,329.

Its detached clock tower is topped with an unusual decorative wrought iron frame housing a bell. Gonfaron is best known for the local Village des Tortues, a rescue and breeding centre for tortoises.

It is served by Gonfaron station on the Marseille–Ventimiglia railway.

See also
Communes of the Var department

References

External links 

Communes of Var (department)